Covington is a city in, and the parish seat of, St. Tammany Parish, Louisiana, United States.  The population was 11,564 at the 2020 United States census. It is located at a fork of the Bogue Falaya and the Tchefuncte River. Covington is part of the New Orleans–Metairie–Kenner metropolitan statistical area. Covington has played a large role in movie making over the past 20 years, with over 30 films

History

The earliest known settlement by Europeans in the area was in 1800 by Jacques Drieux, during the British West Florida period.

In 1813, John Wharton Collins established a town with the name of Wharton. He is buried on the corner of the city cemetery directly across from the Covington Police Department. On March 11, 1816, the town of Wharton was renamed to that of Covington. There are conflicting stories about how the city came to be named Covington. Many historians believe the city was renamed for General Leonard Covington, a hero of the War of 1812. Covington was killed late in 1813, having established his home in the Mississippi Territory.

Local historian Judge Steve Ellis floats another theory centered on the suggestion by Jesse Jones, a local attorney, that the city be named in honor of the Blue Grass whiskey---made in Covington, Kentucky---enjoyed by town officials. In any case, Leonard Covington is the namesake of both towns.

Originally, commerce was brought to Covington via boat up the Bogue Falaya River, which used the Tchefuncte River as a means of passage to and from Lake Pontchartrain. Then in 1888, the railroad came to town. Much of the former railroad right-of-way is now occupied by the Tammany Trace, a thirty-one mile bike trail running east and west through several communities on the north side of Lake Pontchartrain.

In the late 20th century, with the expansion of Louisiana's road system, many people who worked in New Orleans started living in Covington, commuting to work via the Lake Pontchartrain Causeway.  With the expansion of the interstate system, Covington experienced a boom of growth. Many people moved to the Northshore for more affordable housing, larger lot size and a small town feeling.  This is considered to be associated with white flight out of New Orleans, though the Jefferson Parish area saw the most expansion during that period.

Hurricane Katrina
Hurricane Katrina made landfall near Slidell, but Covington was sufficiently elevated to escape the massive storm surge; however, the city suffered devastating wind damage. Following the storm, Covington, along with the rest of the north shore of Lake Pontchartrain, experienced a population boom as a result of many former inhabitants of New Orleans, its south shore suburbs, and its west bank suburbs being forced to move out of their storm-ravaged homes. The city's population continues to grow.

Geography

Neighborhoods
The city is divided into many subdivisions. Notable ones include the communities of: West 30s, West 20s, Ozone,  Tchefuncta Country Club, Covington Country Club, Downtown Covington, as well as Barkley Parc./

Vegetation
Covington is rich in native plant species because of its diversity in habitats. Native plants include: Lemonade berry, Virginia Willow, century plant, Cream wild indigo, elderberry, boysenberry and huckleberry

Awards and recognition

Covington has earned the 2nd Best City to Live In Louisiana according to the Chamber of Commerce /

The Covington Bicentennial Parade 2013 earned Covington a 2nd place statewide award for community achievement for outstanding community improvement in economic development. /

Demographics

As of the 2020 United States census, there were 11,564 people, 3,710 households, and 2,546 families residing in the city. In 2010, the population of Covington was 8,765. At the 2000 United States census, there were 8,483 people, 3,258 households, and 2,212 families residing in the city.

In 2000, the racial makeup of the city was 77.45% White, 20.17% African American, 0.33% Native American, 0.34% Asian, 0.04% Pacific Islander, 0.25% from other races, and 1.43% from two or more races. Hispanic or Latino of any race were 1.56% of the population. In 2019, the racial and ethnic makeup of the city was 77.6% White, 18.9% Black and African American, 0.2% American Indian or Alaska Native, 0.4% Asian, 0.6% some other race, and 2.3% two or more races.

At the 2000 U.S. census, there were 3,258 households, out of which 33.8% had children under the age of 18 living with them, 46.8% were married couples living together, 17.2% had a female householder with no husband present, and 32.1% were non-families. 27.5% of all households were made up of individuals, and 9.9% had someone living alone who was 65 years of age or older. The average household size was 2.52 and the average family size was 3.10.

In the city, the population was spread out, with 26.8% under the age of 18, 8.5% from 18 to 24, 26.1% from 25 to 44, 24.1% from 45 to 64, and 14.5% who were 65 years of age or older. The median age was 38 years.  For every 100 females, there were 86.8 males. For every 100 females age 18 and over, there were 80.0 males.

The median income for a household in the city was $36,949, and the median income for a family was $50,332. Males had a median income of $36,434 versus $23,859 for females. The per capita income for the city was $21,438. About 11.8% of families and 16.1% of the population were below the poverty line, including 23.5% of those under age 18 and 17.2% of those age 65 or over. The 2019 American Community Survey determined the city had a median income of $71,548 and poverty rate of 13.4%.

Economy
The Covington Market Square, a popular community gathering place in the center of the city, is home to many businesses, including Starbucks, The Southern Hotel, Toad Hollow, The English Tea Room and Eatery, and the Covington Branch of the St. Tammany Parish Library.

The city is home to Zen-Noh Grain Corporation, a subsidiary of the Japanese cooperative Zen-Noh. as well as the satellite communications company that operates a low Earth orbit satellite constellation, Globalstar. Bevolo Gas and Electric Lights has a manufacturing facility in Covington.

The Tulane National Primate Research Center, a federally funded biomedical research facility affiliated with Tulane University, is situated on 500 acres of land in Covington.

Points of interest

A  statue of Ronald Reagan on a  base is reputed to be the world's largest of the former president.

The Covington trail head is the start of Tammany Trace, a 31-mile paved rails-to-trails path for hikers and bicyclists, which connects Covington with Mandeville, Abita Springs, Lacombe and Slidell.

Education
St. Tammany Parish Public Schools  operates public schools in Covington.
 Covington High School (9-12)
 Pitcher Junior High School (7-8)
 Pine View Middle School (4-6)
 Covington Elementary School (K-3)
 Lyon Elementary School (K-3)

Lee Road Junior High School has a Covington address but is outside the city limits and not serving any portion of the city.

Private schools
 Northlake Christian School

Golf
Covington Louisiana, and the surrounding areas are a main hub for golfing attracting many visitors per month year round. Notable golf courses include:

Notable people

 Christian Bogle, racing driver
 Peggy Dow (Peggy Varnadow Helmerich), film actress and philanthropist, lived much of her childhood in Covington
 Frank Burton Ellis, state senator (1940–1944), U.S. District Court judge, 1962–1965
 Dave Fortman, guitarist for the band Ugly Kid Joe and current American music producer, graduated from Covington High School
 Elizabeth Futral, opera soprano reared in Covington. Her father was minister of the Covington First Baptist Church for many years.
 Daniel F. Galouye, science fiction writer
 Katherine Haik, Miss Teen USA 2015
 Robert Higgs, economist. Lived in Covington for several years.
 Pete Maravich, NBA all-star, lived in Covington until his death in 1988
 Walker Percy, author and essayist, lived in Covington until his death in 1990
 Harry Reeks, landscape painter and combat artist for the U.S. Marine Corps.
 Leon Rene, songwriter
 Amy Serrano, filmmaker, poet, essayist, and humanitarian
 Amanda Shaw, Cajun fiddler, singer, and actress
 Ian Somerhalder, actor and model, born in Covington
 Stephen Stills, musician  
 Hank Stram, NFL Hall of Fame Coach. Lived in Covington until his death in July 2005
 Lauren Turner, singer/songwriter,  American Idol contestant season 10, graduated from Covington High School
 Greta Valenti, television producer
 Theo Von, comedian and podcaster grew up in Covington

Movies filmed in Covington
 1995 — Dead Man Walking
 1995 — Kingfish: A Story of Huey P. Long
 1997 — Eve's Bayou
 2005 — Local Color
 2008 — The Yellow Handkerchief
 2009 — I Love You Phillip Morris
 2010 — The Pregnancy Pact
 2012 — The Lucky One
 2013 — Beautiful Creatures
 2014 — American Ultra
 2015 — Joe Dirt 2
 2019 — The Highwaymen''

References

External links

 Covington Business Association
 Inside Northside special issue, Covington 1813–2013

 
Cities in Louisiana
Cities in St. Tammany Parish, Louisiana
Cities in the New Orleans metropolitan area
Parish seats in Louisiana
Populated coastal places in Louisiana